Brendan Keyes is an Irish football manager and former player who currently owns and coaches Celtic FC America. Keyes also founded and operates the Texas Premier Soccer League.

Football career
Keyes began his playing career as a youth in Ireland with Stella Maris F.C. and Home Farm F.C. In 1996 Keyes moved to Houston and joined the Houston Eagles. He would later play with the original Houston Hurricanes (USISL) in the 1990s.

Football management
In July 2010 Keyes became owner of the Galveston Pirate SC, where he was already head coach and general manager. The team won the National Premier Soccer League South Central Division in 2012.

In 2013 he moved the team to Houston and renamed it Houston Hurricanes FC.

In January 2019 Keyes partnered with Alberto Escobar and Ricardo Alarcon to continue on in TPSL and grow the league throughout Texas. The TPSL is sanctioned by US Club soccer.

TPSL Announce C.F.C.A for upcoming 2019 season, source Houston Chronicle https://www.chron.com/neighborhood/bayarea/sports/article/Soccer-Celtic-FC-America-looks-to-find-permanent-14083160.php

Season-by-season

References

External links
Official website
Texas Premier Soccer League
Official website
Official website

Living people
Year of birth missing (living people)
Republic of Ireland association footballers
Republic of Ireland expatriate association footballers
Expatriate soccer players in the United States
Houston Force players
American soccer coaches
Association footballers not categorized by position